Lumen, formerly Chilling Effects, is an American collaborative archive created by Wendy Seltzer and founded along with several law school clinics and the Electronic Frontier Foundation to protect lawful online activity from legal threats. Lumen is a "project" of the Berkman Klein Center. Its website, Chilling Effects Clearinghouse, allows recipients of cease-and-desist notices to submit them to the site and receive information about their legal rights and responsibilities. Founded in 2001 in San Francisco, California, it later moved its operations to Massachusetts.

Inception
The archive was founded in 2001 by Internet activists who were concerned that the unregulated private practice of sending cease-and-desist letters seemed to be increasing and was having an unstudied, but potentially significant, "chilling effect" on free speech.

The archive got a boost when Google began submitting its notices to the site in 2002. Google began to do so in response to the publicity generated when the Church of Scientology convinced Google to remove references and links to an anti-Scientology web site, Operation Clambake, in April 2002. The incident inspired vocal Internet users and groups to complain to Google, and links to the Clambake site were restored. Google subsequently began to contribute its notices to Chilling Effects, archiving the Scientology complaints and linking to the archive.

Starting in 2002, researchers used the clearinghouse to study the use of cease-and-desist letters, primarily looking at Digital Millennium Copyright Act (DMCA) 512 takedown notices, non-DMCA copyright issues, and trademark claims.

On November 2, 2015, Chilling Effects announced its renaming to Lumen, as well as a number of international partnerships.

Reception
Lumen has been praised for providing and promoting transparency on the use of copyright takedowns.

The Copyright Alliance has criticized Lumen for republishing lists of URLs named in takedowns as part of its database. It argued that this defeats the purpose and intent of sending takedown notices to search engines in the first place, as they would subsequently be added to "the largest repository of URLs hosting infringing content on the internet.". While the Lumen database formerly used to show full URLs, in 2019 the URLs were redacted to only display the website names and the number of URLs from each site, with the full URLs only to be made available to authorised users.

Members
 Berkman Center for Internet and Society, Harvard Law School
 Electronic Frontier Foundation
 George Washington University Law School
 Samuelson Law, Technology and Public Policy Clinic, Boalt Hall
 Santa Clara University School of Law High Tech Law Institute
 Stanford Center for Internet and Society, Stanford Law School
 University of Maine School of Law
 IIP Justice Project, University of San Francisco School of Law

See also

 Censorship by Google

References

External links
 

Internet-related activism
Internet-based activism
Freedom of expression organizations
Organizations established in 2001
2001 establishments in the United States
Digital Millennium Copyright Act takedown incidents
Scientology and the Internet
Internet censorship
Information society